Frankfurt am Main I is an electoral constituency (German: Wahlkreis) represented in the Bundestag. It elects one member via first-past-the-post voting. Under the current constituency numbering system, it is designated as constituency 182. It is located in southern Hesse, comprising the western part of the city of Frankfurt am Main.

Frankfurt am Main I was created for the inaugural 1949 federal election. Since 2021, it has been represented by Armand Zorn of the Social Democratic Party (SPD).

Geography
Frankfurt am Main I is located in southern Hesse. As of the 2021 federal election, it comprises the Ortsbezirke of Innenstadt I, Innenstadt II, West (excluding Schwanheim Ortsteil), Mitte-West, Nord-West, and Mitte-Nord from the independent city of Frankfurt am Main.

History
Frankfurt am Main I was created in 1949, then known as Frankfurt/M I. From 1965 through 1972, it was named Frankfurt I. In the 1976 election, it was named Frankfurt (Main) I – Main-Taunus. From 1980 through 1998, it was named Frankfurt am Main I – Main-Taunus. It acquired its current name in the 2002 election. In the 1949 election, it was Hesse constituency 15 in the numbering system. From 1953 through 1976, it was number 140. From 1980 through 1998, it was number 138. In the 2002 and 2005 elections, it was number 183. Since the 2009 election, it has been number 182.

Originally, the constituency comprised the Stadtbezirke of Oberrad, Sachsenhausen, Niederrad, Goldstein, Schwanheim, Griesheim, Nied, Höchst, Sindlingen, Zeilsheim, Unterliederbach, and Sossenheim from the city of Frankfurt am Main. In the 1976 through 1998 elections, it comprised the Stadtbezirke of Rödelheim, Hausen, Praunheim, Schwanheim, Goldstein-West, Griesheim, Nied, Höchst, Sindlingen, Zeilsheim, Unterliederbach, and Sossenheim from the city of Frankfurt am Main, as well as the municipalities of Bad Soden, Eschborn, Hattersheim, Kriftel, Liederbach, Schwalbach am Taunus, and Sulzbach (Taunus) from the Main-Taunus-Kreis district. It acquired its current borders in the 2002 election.

Members
The constituency was first represented by Hermann Brill of the Social Democratic Party (SPD) from 1949 to 1953, followed by Peter Horn of the Christian Democratic Union (CDU) from 1953 to 1961. Georg Leber regained it for the SPD in 1965 and served until 1976, when he was succeeded by Karsten Voigt. Heinz Riesenhuber of the CDU won the constituency in 1983 and was representative until 2002. Gudrun Schaich-Walch was elected for the SPD in 2002 and served a single term, followed by fellow SPD member Gregor Amann in 2005. Matthias Zimmer was elected in 2009, and re-elected in 2013 and 2017. Armand Zorn won the constituency for the SPD in 2021.

Election results

2021 election

2017 election

2013 election

2009 election

References

Federal electoral districts in Hesse
1949 establishments in West Germany
Constituencies established in 1949
Frankfurt